The men's long jump event at the 1970 Summer Universiade was held at the Stadio Comunale in Turin on 3 and 4 September 1970.

Medalists

Results

Qualification

Final

References

Athletics at the 1970 Summer Universiade
1970